The 1955–56 season was the 76th season of competitive football by Rangers.

Overview
Rangers played a total of 46 competitive matches during the 1955–56 season.

Results
All results are written with Rangers' score first.

Scottish League Division One

Scottish Cup

League Cup

Appearances

See also
 1955–56 in Scottish football
 1955–56 Scottish Cup
 1955–56 Scottish League Cup

References 

Scottish football championship-winning seasons
Rangers F.C. seasons
Rangers